Heidi Marie Kriznik (born 23 February 1970) is a Norwegian novelist. She has served as chair of the Norwegian Authors' Union since 2017.

Career
Kriznik made her literary début in 2002 with the novel Applaus, for which she was awarded the Tarjei Vesaas' debutantpris. In 2007 she published the novel Borte en vinter, and her next novel from 2012 was Du kan sove her. She was elected chairman of the board of the Norwegian Authors' Union in 2017.

Personal life
Kriznik was born on 23 February 1970, and resides in Oslo.

References

1970 births
Living people
Norwegian women novelists
21st-century Norwegian novelists
21st-century Norwegian women writers